Stirpe is a surname. Notable people with the surname include:

 Davide Stirpe (born 1992), Italian motorcycle racer
 Albert A. Stirpe Jr. (born 1953), American politician

See also
 Stirpes